Trigonostoma elegantulum is a species of sea snail, a marine gastropod mollusc in the family Cancellariidae, the nutmeg snails.

Description

Distribution

References

 Hemmen J. (2007). Recent Cancellariidae. Wiesbaden, 428pp.

Cancellariidae
Gastropods described in 1947